Carlos Enrique Gutiérrez Ortega (born July 11, 1972) is a retired Colombian football midfielder, who has represented his country.

Club career

Gutiérrez made his debut in the Colombian First Division in 1995 with América de Cali. He played for atl nacional in 1996 and returned to America and played for real cartagena. While at America Gutiérrez participated in the 1998 Copa Libertadores and helped the club capture the 1999 Copa Merconorte, as well as two Colombian League titles. In 2001, he joined Millonarios and helped them capture the Copa Merconorte 2001. He scored two crucial away goals versus Necaxa in Mexico on November 20, 2001 helping his club reach the finals. He started both legs of the final versus Emelec of Ecuador, scoring the winning penalty during the penalty shootout. His performance against Necaxa helped him secure a contract with the Mexican side in 2002, he would go on to be a starter for Necaxa, appearing in 28 league matches and 6 playoff matches in his one year in Mexico. Following his stay in Mexico, Gutiérrez returned to Colombia as the star signing for Centauros Villavicencio. After playing well with Centauros, Gutiérrez returned to Millonarios in 2004. He did not play as much as he would like with Millonarios, so he moved to Deportes Quindío in 2005. He then moved to Ecuador for a short stay with Deportivo Cuenca where he would participate in the 2006 Copa Libertadores. After another short stay in Peru with Club Sport Áncash, Gutiérrez was signed by newly promoted La Equidad to add his experience to the squad. He helped lead La Equidad to its first domestic title by winning the Copa Colombia 2008.

International

Gutiérrez represented Colombia at various levels. He was called up to the full national side in 1995 and appeared in one match.

Titles

References
 
 
 colombia.com
 

Living people
1972 births
Colombian footballers
Association football midfielders
América de Cali footballers
Real Cartagena footballers
Millonarios F.C. players
Club Necaxa footballers
Centauros Villavicencio footballers
Lagartos de Tabasco footballers
Deportes Quindío footballers
C.D. Cuenca footballers
Sport Áncash footballers
La Equidad footballers
Categoría Primera A players
Liga MX players
Ascenso MX players
Colombian expatriate footballers
Expatriate footballers in Ecuador
Expatriate footballers in Mexico
Expatriate footballers in Peru
Colombia international footballers
Sportspeople from Antioquia Department